John Gehman Farm is a historic farm complex and national historic district located in Hereford Township, Berks County, Pennsylvania.  It has seven contributing buildings.  They are the -story, stone and log Swiss bank house (c. 1767); stone Pennsylvania bank barn (1806); -story, vernacular stone farmhouse (c. 1810), stable, wagon shed, and privy.  The Gehman family owned the farm from about 1767 to 1945. They were of German ancestry, originating in the Rhineland-Palatinate region of Germany.

It was listed on the National Register of Historic Places in 1992.

References

Farms on the National Register of Historic Places in Pennsylvania
Palatine German settlement in Pennsylvania
Historic districts on the National Register of Historic Places in Pennsylvania
Houses completed in 1767
Houses in Berks County, Pennsylvania
1767 establishments in Pennsylvania
National Register of Historic Places in Berks County, Pennsylvania